The Train de Charlevoix is a tourist rail service between Beauport (Chutes Montmorency) and La Malbaie, Quebec, with an additional stop in Baie-Saint-Paul and in the winter at the Le Massif ski area, a distance of about . It is owned and operated by Le Massif de Charlevoix, which also owns the Le Massif ski area.

The train no longer runs in the winter, so there is no service to the ski area. Service is offered from June to October. However, as of 2019 the train will run in winter.

History

Grand Trunk & Canadian National Railways
As early as 1928, regular year-round passenger service operated once a day as far as La Malbaie (then referred to as Murray Bay). A seasonal second train per day service operated from June to September from Quebec City. By 1931, the service was extended to Montreal. At this time, only freight would continue to Clermont. By 1944, the extra train operated during summer months was dropped from the schedule, resulting in a once-daily schedule year round. In February 1971, Canadian National extended service to Clermont.

Via Rail
In 1977, Via Rail took over operation of most Canadian National and Canadian Pacific passenger services. By this time, Gare du Palais was closed for renovations, and Ste-Foy became the origin of all trains on the route, with a stop at Limoilou near the core of Quebec City. VIA Rail began operating the service daily with Budd Rail Diesel Cars. VIA Rail cancelled the train by the end of 1977.

Current tourist railway
Work on starting the train began in September 2008, when renovation of Charlevoix Railway trackage began, partially funded by grants from the national and provincial governments, and with a total cost of C$18.4 million. In April 2010, work began on rebuilding eight railcars at a cost of close to $5 million; the cars were originally built in 1955 and 1956 by the St Louis Car Company and were previously used in commuter rail service in Chicago. Once refitted, the eight cars had a total capacity of 550 people, and along with two MLW RS-18 locomotives comprise the rolling stock used for the train. The refurbished rolling stock is now in storage, with the current rolling stock being two married pairs of DB Class 628.1, with a third added in 2018 for increased service. In early 2019, it was announced that the train would begin operating during the winter months in partnership with a new Club Med location opening at the ski hill.

List of stations 

 Chutes Montmorency
 Sainte-Anne-de-Beaupré
 Petite-Rivière-Saint-François
 Baie-St-Paul
 Les Éboulements
 Saint-Irénée
 La Malbaie

See also 
 Charlevoix Railway
 Dinner train
 List of heritage railways in Canada

References

External links 
 Official website

Passenger rail transport in Quebec